General René Schneider Chereau (December 31, 1913 – October 25, 1970) was the commander-in-chief of the Chilean Army at the time of the 1970 Chilean presidential election, when he was assassinated during a botched kidnapping attempt. He coined the doctrine of military-political mutual exclusivity that became known as the Schneider Doctrine.

Background
He was born in Concepción, Chile, as a descendant of ethnic German immigrants, and joined the army in 1929. After a brilliant career, he was named Commander-in-Chief on October 27, 1969, by President Eduardo Frei Montalva, as a result of the Tacna agreement.

Schneider had expressed firm opposition to the idea of preventing Salvador Allende's inauguration by means of a coup d'état; as a constitutionalist, he wished to continue the Chilean military's long apolitical history.

Assassination
After the 1970 Chilean presidential election, a plot to kidnap Schneider was developed. "Neutralizing" Schneider became a key prerequisite for a military coup; he opposed any intervention by the armed forces to block Allende's constitutional election. The U.S. Central Intelligence Agency (CIA), who considered Schneider "a major stumbling block for military officers seeking to carry out a coup," supplied a group of Chilean officers led by General Camilo Valenzuela with "sterile" weapons for the operation which was to be blamed on Allende supporters.

First and second attempts
On October 16, 1970, based on an anonymous tip on Schneider's whereabouts, the first group attempted to kidnap him from his home. The tip turned out to be false as he had been on vacation since two days earlier and didn't return till the next day.

On the evening of October 19, 1970, a second group of coup-plotters loyal to General Roberto Viaux, equipped with tear gas grenades attempted to grab Schneider as he left an official dinner. The attempt failed because he left in a private car and not the expected official vehicle. The failure produced an extremely significant cable from CIA headquarters in Washington to the local station, asking for urgent action because "Headquarters must respond during morning 20 October to queries from high levels." Payments of $50,000 each to Viaux and his chief associate were then authorised on the condition that they made another attempt.

Final attempt
On October 22, 1970, the coup-plotters again attempted to kidnap Schneider. His official car was ambushed at a street intersection in the capital city of Santiago. Schneider drew a gun to defend himself, and was shot point-blank several times. According to a report by the Chilean military police, "five individuals, one of who, making use of a blunt instrument similar to a sledgehammer, broke the rear window and then fired at General Schneider, striking him in the region of the spleen, in the left shoulder, and in the left wrist." He was rushed to a military hospital, but the wounds proved fatal and he died three days later, on October 25.

The attempt to kidnap him was because Schneider was the army Commander-in-Chief and considered a constitutionalist, which in practical terms meant that he would not support a coup. This incident and his death provoked national outrage, and caused the citizens and the military to rally behind the just-elected Allende, who was ratified by the Chilean Congress on October 24. It also helped to ensure an orderly transfer of power to Allende.

Military courts in Chile found that Schneider's death was caused by two military groups, one led by Viaux and the other by General Camilo Valenzuela. Viaux and Valenzuela were eventually convicted of charges of conspiring to cause a coup, and Viaux also was convicted of kidnapping. The lawsuit asserted that the CIA had aided both groups, but the charges were never satisfactorily proven, with the expectation of tens of thousands of dollars and submachine guns given to them by the CIA. Peter Kornbluh, director of the National Security Archive's Chile Documentation Project, asserts that CIA documents show "Viaux was not acting independently or unilaterally, but clearly as a co-conspirator with Valenzuela..."

On October 26, 1970, President Eduardo Frei Montalva named General Carlos Prats as Commander-in-Chief to replace Schneider. This happened at the same time that $35,000 was given by the CIA to the kidnappers "to keep the prior contact secret, maintain the goodwill of the group, and for humanitarian reasons."

Lawsuits
On September 10, 2001 Schneider's family filed a suit against Henry Kissinger, accusing him of collaborating with Viaux in arranging for Schneider's murder. While declassified documents show the CIA, displeased with the socialist victory, had explored the idea of supporting Viaux in a coup attempt, they also show that the agency decided on tracking down other members of the Chilean military, deciding that a Viaux coup would fail. Nevertheless, Viaux, acting on the advice of the CIA, teamed up with other coup plotters. CIA documents show unwavering support for Viaux's co-conspirator, Camilo Valenzuela, and also show a $50,000 payment to the kidnap team Viaux had hired. Documents written at the time of the assault on Schneider describe it as part of the "Valenzuela group coup plan." On October 15, 1970 Kissinger allegedly told U.S. President Richard Nixon that he had "turned off" plans to support Viaux, explaining that "Nothing could be worse than an abortive coup." The CIA claimed that no such "stand-down" order was ever received.

The U.S. government claims it did not intend for Schneider to be murdered, only kidnapped. When Alexander Haig, Kissinger's aide, was asked "is kidnapping not a crime?" he replied "that depends." Such an argument would carry no weight in any court of law. Christopher Hitchens noted that Chilean authorities treated the crime as a straightforward murder. He argued that, "under the law of every law-bound country (including the United States), a crime committed in the pursuit of a kidnapping is thereby aggravated, not mitigated. You may not say, with a corpse at your feet, 'I was only trying to kidnap him.'"

The lawsuit against Kissinger was eventually dismissed in the federal district court; the dismissal was subsequently upheld by the D.C. Court of Appeals. A petition for a writ of certiorari to the United States Supreme Court was denied.

See also
 Family Jewels (Central Intelligence Agency)
 Project FUBELT
 CIA activities in Chile

Footnotes and references

External links
Official biography 

Freedom of Information Page
Christian C. Gustafson, Reexamining the Record: CIA Machinations in Chile in 1970
Online News Hour Documents on Chile
The Case Against Kissinger Deepens, Continued. Harper's Magazine. July 6, 2010.

1913 births
1970 deaths
People from Concepción, Chile
Chilean people of German descent
Assassinated Chilean people
Presidency of Salvador Allende
Chilean Army generals
Deaths by firearm in Chile
Dirty wars
People murdered in Chile
1970 murders in Chile